Who Will Tell My Brother? is a 2002 young adult novel by Marlene Carvell.

Reception
The book was reviewed by School Library Journal and Radical Teacher.

Award
The book won an International Reading Association award in 2003 in the Children's and Young Adult's Book category.

See also

References

Books about Native Americans
2002 American novels
American young adult novels
Novels about racism
Novels set in schools